Adela Velarde Pérez (Ciudad Juárez, 8 September de 1900 - United States of America, 
4 September of 1971) was a Mexican activist who fought in the Mexican Revolution.

The daughter of a rich inhabitant of Ciudad Juárez, she realised at a young age that her calling was medicine. In 1915, she joined the Mexican Association of the White Cross. She was the creator of the revolutionary group of the soldaderas, women who healed soldiers wounded in combat, with some of these even taking up arms and fighting.

Even so, Adela Velarde, the "Adelita", was not recognized for her value in combat and after the Mexican Revolution, she was forgotten. It was only in 1962 that she was finally recognized as a veteran of the Revolution and for her opposition to the government of Victoriano Huerta. She died in abject poverty in the United States, in 1971.

However, now Adela Velarde Pérez is recognized as the woman whose name represents all the nurses who provided their services not only to care for the sick and wounded during the Mexican Revolution, but also to carry weapons, take care of food and even participate in battles if required.

The composer Antonio del Río dedicated "No me importa" (I don't care) to her, explaining "Several songs like La Charrita, and according to some versions, the song La Adelita, are dedicated to her."

See also  

 Soldadera

References

External Links 
 

1900 births
1971 deaths

Mexican activists
Women in war
National personifications
Mexican Revolution
Patriotic songs